Jalna Assembly constituency is one of the 288 Vidhan Sabha (legislative assembly) constituencies of Maharashtra state in western India.

Overview
Jalna is part of the Jalna Lok Sabha constituency along with five other Vidhan Sabha segments, namely Badnapur and Bhokardan in Jalna district and Phulambri, Silod and Paithan in the Aurangabad district.

Members of Legislative Assembly
 1995: Arjun Khotkar, Shiv Sena
 1999: Kailash Kishanrao Gorantyal, INC 
 2004: Arjun Khotkar, Shiv Sena
 2009: Kailash Kishanrao Gorantyal, INC
 2014: Arjun Khotkar, Shiv Sena
 2019: Kailash Kishanrao Gorantyal, INC

Election results

Assembly Elections 2004

Assembly Elections 2009

Assembly Elections 2014

References

Assembly constituencies of Maharashtra
Assembly constituencies of Jalna district
Jalna, Maharashtra